Meena Warpudkar is an Indian politician of Indian National Congress from Parbhani, Maharashtra, India. She was Mayor of Parbhani Municipal Corporation.

Personal life
Meenatai Warpudkar married Suresh Warpudkar on 29 June 1974. The couple have one son and two daughters. her husband is four time MLA and a former minister of state of Government of Maharashtra currently representing Pathri (Vidhan Sabha constituency) in Maharashtra Legislative Assembly.

Political career
Meenatai Warpudkar started her political career as Indian National Congress corporator of Parbhani Municipal Corporation. she was elected as mayor of Parbhani Municipal Corporation on 15 May 2017. She received 40 votes in favour while her rival Alia Anjum got 18 votes in house.

References

Year of birth missing (living people)
Living people
Indian National Congress politicians from Maharashtra
People from Marathwada
People from Parbhani 
People from Parbhani district 
Maharashtra municipal councillors